Roland Joseph Culver,  (31 August 1900 – 1 March 1984) was an English stage, film, and television actor.

Life and career
After Highgate School, he joined the Royal Air Force and served as a pilot from 1918 to 1919. After considering other careers, he turned to acting, graduating from the Royal Academy of Dramatic Art. He debuted on the stage in 1924 at Hull Repertory Theatre and, by 1931, was appearing in films in which he was known for his portrayals of impeccable English gentlemen not given to displays of emotion. In the 1960s he branched out into television before finally retiring in 1983. 
In 1960 he appeared in Five Finger Exercise at the Music Box Theatre in New York City. He was nominated for the 1966 Tony Award for Best Performance by a Leading Actor in a Play for Ivanov. In 1974 he played the irascible Duke of Omnium and Gatherum in the popular BBC adaptation of, The Pallisers.

He lost half a lung to tuberculosis.

Personal life 
He was married twice, first to actress, director, and casting agent Daphne Rye between 1932 and 1946, then to Nan Hopkins from 1947 until his death from a heart attack in 1984. With his first wife he had two children: actor Michael Culver and Robin Culver.

Culver was awarded an OBE in the 1980 Queen's Birthday Honours for services to drama.

Writer 
Culver wrote the play A River Breeze, and his autobiography is called Not Quite a Gentleman.

Complete filmography

References

External links

 
 
 
 

 BBC Desert Island Discs Archive programme

1900 births
1984 deaths
Alumni of RADA
English male film actors
English male stage actors
English male television actors
People educated at Highgate School
People from Highgate
People from Oxfordshire
Royal Air Force personnel of World War I
Officers of the Order of the British Empire
20th-century English male actors
British expatriate male actors in the United States
British World War I pilots